Dolvoaua is an unincorporated community in Kimball County, Nebraska. It is located at 41°1'15"N 103°50'59"W.

References

Geography of Nebraska